Yenikent may refer to:

 Yenikent, Aksaray, village in Aksaray Province, Turkey
 Yenikent, Sinop, town in Sinop Province, Turkey

See also 
 Jankent